Vilavelhense Futebol Clube, commonly known as Vilavelhense, is a Brazilian football club based in Vila Velha, Espírito Santo state. They competed in the Copa do Brasil once.

History
The club was founded on February 10, 2003. They won the Campeonato Capixaba Second Level in 2003 and the Copa Espírito Santo in 2006. Vilavelhense was eliminated in the First Round in the 2007 Copa do Brasil by Treze.

Achievements
 Campeonato Capixaba Second Level:
 Winners (2): 2003 and 2020
 Copa Espírito Santo:
 Winners (1): 2006

Stadium
Vilavelhense Futebol Clube play their home games at Estádio Glória. The stadium has a maximum capacity of 5,000 people.

References

Association football clubs established in 2003
Football clubs in Espírito Santo
2003 establishments in Brazil